Ernest Alexandre Ansermet (11 November 1883 – 20 February 1969) was a Swiss conductor.

Biography 
Ansermet was born in Vevey, Switzerland. Originally he was a mathematics professor, teaching at the University of Lausanne. He began conducting at the Casino in Montreux in 1912, and from 1915 to 1923 was the conductor for Diaghilev's Ballets Russes. Travelling in France for this, he met both Claude Debussy and Maurice Ravel, and consulted them on the performance of their works. During World War I, he met Igor Stravinsky, who was exiled in Switzerland, and from this meeting began the conductor's lifelong association with Russian music.

In 1918 Ansermet founded his own orchestra, the Orchestre de la Suisse Romande (OSR). He toured widely in Europe and America and became famous for accurate performances of difficult modern music, making first recordings of works such as Stravinsky's Capriccio with the composer as soloist. Ansermet was one of the first in the field of classical music to take jazz seriously, and in 1919 he wrote an article praising Sidney Bechet.

After World War II, Ansermet and his orchestra rose to international prominence through a long-term contract with Decca Records. From that time until his death, he recorded most of his repertoire, often two or three times. His interpretations were widely regarded as admirably clear and authoritative, though the orchestral playing did not always reach the highest international standards, and they differed notably from those of other famous 20th-century specialists, notably Pierre Monteux and Stravinsky himself. Ansermet disapproved of Stravinsky's practice of revising his works, and always played the original versions. Although famous for performing much modern music by other composers such as Arthur Honegger and Frank Martin, he avoided altogether the music of Arnold Schoenberg and his associates, even criticizing Stravinsky when he began to use twelve-tone techniques in his compositions.  In Ansermet's book, Les fondements de la musique dans la conscience humaine (1961), he sought to prove, using Husserlian phenomenology and partly his own mathematical studies, that Schoenberg's idiom was false and irrational.  He labeled it a "Jewish idea" and went on to say that "the Jew is a me who speaks as though he were an I," that the Jew "suffers from thoughts doubly misformed", thus making him "suitable for the handling of money", and sums up with the statement that "historic creation of Western music" would have developed just as well "without the Jew".  
Ansermet's reputation suffered after the war because of his collaboration with the Nazis and he was boycotted in the new state of Israel.

In May 1954 Decca recorded Ansermet and the orchestra in Europe's first commercial stereophonic recordings. They went on to record the first stereo performance of the complete The Nutcracker by Tchaikovsky on LP (Artur Rodziński had already recorded a stereo performance on magnetic tape, but this had been released on LP only in mono). Ansermet also conducted early stereo recordings of  Debussy's Nocturnes and the Prélude à l'après-midi d'un faune. Part of his recording of The Rite of Spring, augmented by a rehearsal recording unobtainable elsewhere, was used by Decca on the company's 1957 stereo demonstration LP, A Journey into Stereo Sound. The conductor's clear and methodical counting of beats is a distinct feature of this rehearsal sequence. In his last years he and his ensemble recorded works by Haydn, Beethoven and Brahms.

His last recording, of Stravinsky's The Firebird, was made in London with the New Philharmonia Orchestra in 1968, which included a recording of the rehearsal sessions issued as a memorial to him.  Another late recording for Decca, also issued as a memorial album, was with L'Orchestre de la Suisse Romande, and was devoted to Albéric Magnard's Symphony No. 3 and Édouard Lalo's Scherzo for Orchestra.

Ansermet composed some piano pieces and compositions for orchestra, among them a symphonic poem entitled Feuilles de Printemps (Leaves of Spring). He also orchestrated Debussy's Six épigraphes antiques in 1939.

He died on 20 February 1969 in Geneva at the age of 85.

Notable premieres

In concert 
 Stravinsky, Histoire du soldat, Lausanne, 28 September 1918
 Stravinsky, Capriccio for Piano and Orchestra, composer as soloist, 6 December 1929
 Stravinsky, Mass, 27 October 1948

On stage 
 Manuel de Falla, The Three-Cornered Hat, Ballets Russes, Paris, 1919, a ballet for which Léonide Massine created the choreography and Pablo Picasso designed the sets and costumes. (Ansermet later recorded this in stereo.)
 Stravinsky, Pulcinella, Ballets Russes, Paris, 15 May 1920
 Prokofiev, Chout, Ballets Russes, Paris, 1921
 Stravinsky, Renard, Ballets Russes, Paris, 18 May 1922
 Stravinsky, Les noces, Ballets Russes, Paris, 13 June 1923
 Benjamin Britten, The Rape of Lucretia, Glyndebourne, 12 July 1946

On record 
 Stravinsky, Capriccio for Piano and Orchestra, composer as soloist, May 1930

Writings 
 Ansermet, Ernest. 1961. Les fondements de la musique dans la conscience humaine. 2 v. Neuchâtel: La Baconnière. New edition, edited by J.-Claude Piguet, Rose-Marie Faller-Fauconnet, et al. Neuchâtel: La Baconnière, 1987. 
 Ansermet, Ernest. 1973. "L'apport de Paul Hindemith à la musique du XXe siècle." In Hommage à Paul Hindemith: 1895–1963 : l'homme et l'œuvre. Yverdon: Éditions de la Revue musicale de suisse romande.
 Ansermet, Ernest. 1983. Ecrits sur la musique. Edited by Jean-Claude Piguet. New rev. ed. Neuchâtel: La Baconnière.

Correspondence 

 Piguet, Jean-Claude (ed.) 1976. . Edited by Jean-Claude Piguet, with notes by Jacques Burdet. Neuchâtel: La Baconnière.
 Tappolet, Claude (ed.). 2006. . Geneva: Georg.
 Tappolet, Claude (ed.). 1999. . Geneva: Georg. 
 Tappolet, Claude (ed.). 1998. . Preface by Philippe Dinkel, postface by Jean-Jacques Langendorf. Geneva: Georg Editeur.
 Tappolet, Claude (ed.). 1990–91. . Geneva, Switzerland: Georg.
 Tappolet, Claude (ed.). 1989a. . Preface by Maurice Zermatten. Geneva: Georg; Paris: Eshel. 
 Tappolet, Claude (ed.). 1989b. Lettres de compositeurs suisses à Ernest Ansermet, 1906–1963  Avant-propos by Conrad Beck; postface by Julien-François Zbinden. Geneva: Georg. 
 Tappolet, Claude (ed.). 1983. . Preface by René Dovaz. Geneva: Georg.

References

External links 

 
 Ernest Ansermet biography at the Bach Cantatas Website
 Ernest Ansermet discography

1883 births
1969 deaths
People from Vevey
20th-century conductors (music)
Swiss conductors (music)
Male conductors (music)
Decca Records artists
Burials at Cimetière des Rois
20th-century male musicians